The HBCU Legacy Bowl is an annual post-season American college football all-star game for NFL draft-eligible players from historically black colleges and universities (HBCU).

History

The event was announced by the Black College Football Hall of Fame on March 18, 2021. The game was founded by the Black College Football Hall of Fame, National Football League (NFL), Pro Football Hall of Fame, and Tulane University. The inaugural bowl was contested on February 19, 2022, at Yulman Stadium on the campus of Tulane University in New Orleans; it was broadcast on NFL Network.

Starting in February 2023, the bowl also hosts the NFL's HBCU Combine, which was first held at the 2022 Senior Bowl.

Game results
The bowl's teams are named after Jake Gaither, coach of the Florida A&M Rattlers from 1945 to 1973, and Eddie Robinson, coach of the Grambling State Tigers from 1941 to 1997.

MVPs

References

External links

College football all-star games
American football competitions in New Orleans
College football bowls in Louisiana
2022 establishments in Louisiana
Recurring sporting events established in 2022